Thomas Edward Knightley (1824–1905) was a British architect responsible for designing the Queen's Hall and St Paul's Church, Isle of Dogs in London.

Knightley was sometimes considered eccentric; for example, he used the bodies of dead mice to act as a guide for the painters on the Queen's Hall, his preferred colour matching the shade of grey found on the mice's bellies.

Gallery

References

1824 births
1905 deaths
19th-century English architects